This is a list of the National Register of Historic Places listings in Glacier National Park.

This is intended to be a complete list of the properties and districts on the National Register of Historic Places in Glacier National Park, United States.  The locations of National Register properties and districts for which the latitude and longitude coordinates are included below, may be seen in a Google map.

There are 94 properties and districts listed on the National Register in the park, three of which are National Historic Landmarks.

There are more than 700 historic structures in the park, though.  The National Park Service's "Ranger Melissa", host of Science Fridays series, introduces architectural historian Kim Hyatt, to introduce the topic and show a number of examples, in a 10 minute film available here or here. It starts with coverage of the Margaret McCarthy Homestead.

Current listings 

|}

See also 
 National Register of Historic Places listings in Flathead County, Montana
 National Register of Historic Places listings in Glacier County, Montana
 List of National Historic Landmarks in Montana
 National Register of Historic Places listings in Montana

References 

Historical Research Associates. National Register of Historic Places Multiple Property Documentation Form: Multiple Resource Submission for Historically and Architecturally Significant Resources in Glacier National Park, Montana. National Park Service 1987 

Glacier National Park